Route 333 is a short provincial highway located in the Laurentides region of Quebec. It runs for 16 kilometers from Saint-Jérôme at the junction of Route 117 to Saint-Hippolyte and serves mainly several large lakes located between Sainte-Adèle and Saint-Jérôme.

Municipalities along Route 333
 Saint-Jérôme
 Sainte-Sophie
 Saint-Hippolyte

Major intersections

See also
 List of Quebec provincial highways

References

External links 
 Official Transports Quebec Road Map Network 
 Route 333 on Google Maps

333